Thirty Tigers is an American entertainment company which offers music marketing, distribution, and management services to independent artists. It is based in Nashville.

History 
The company was founded in 2002 by David Macias and Deb Markland and is distributed by RED Distribution.

In 2014, Thirty Tigers entered into a "strategic partnership" with Columbia Nashville to promote Chase Rice's single "Ready Set Roll" to Top 40 Country Radio. This was an unprecedented agreement as it may have been the first time a major country label offered their radio promotion services to an artist who was not on their label.

In 2016, Thirty Tigers partnered with Triple 8 Management and Sony Music to create the country label Triple Tigers. Triple Tigers signed Russell Dickerson and Scotty McCreery as the first acts on their roster.

Overview 
Thirty Tigers is not a record label, but releases around 45 albums per year for artists who retain ownership and control of their music and career choices.

Thirty Tigers has significant influence in the Americana music community, but works with artists from a wide range of genres including folk, indie rock, urban, and country.

Roster 
The company's roster includes the following artists.
Alphabetical by first letter
Adeem the Artist
 Aaron Watson
 AHI
 Alanis Morissette 
 American Aquarium
 Angaleena Presley
 Bruce Hornsby
 Charley Crockett
 Chase Rice
 Chris Knight
 Colter Wall
 Darlingside
 Elizabeth Cook
 Gone West
 Hembree
 Jamestown Revival
 Jason Eady
 Jason Isbell
 Jordan Fletcher
 Lucinda Williams
 Lupe Fiasco 
 Lucero
 Metric
 Morgan Wade
 Parker Millsap
 Patty Griffin
 Russell Dickerson
 Ryan Bingham
 Shelby Lynne and Allison Moorer
 Son Volt
 St. Paul and The Broken Bones
 Strand of Oaks
 Sturgill Simpson
 The Avett Brothers
 Trampled by Turtles

References

External links 

 Thirty Tigers

2002 establishments in Tennessee
Companies based in Nashville, Tennessee
Marketing companies established in 2002
Music publishing companies of the United States
Sony Music